Fire House No. 3 is a historic fire station located at South Bend, St. Joseph County, Indiana.  It was built in 1892, and is a -story, rectangular, Queen Anne style brick building.  It has a gable front and cross-gable roof and features a simple square hose drying tower.  It remained in use as a fire station until the 1960s, after which it was adapted for commercial uses.

It was listed on the National Register of Historic Places in 1999.

References

Fire stations on the National Register of Historic Places in Indiana
Queen Anne architecture in Indiana
Government buildings completed in 1892
Buildings and structures in South Bend, Indiana
Houses in St. Joseph County, Indiana
National Register of Historic Places in St. Joseph County, Indiana